Victor Charlet (born 19 November 1993) is a French field hockey player who plays as a defender for Belgian club Waterloo Ducks and the French national team.

Career

Club hockey
At club level, Charlet plays for the Waterloo Ducks in the Belgian Hockey League. In March 2020, Charlet extended his contract with the club until 2024.

International hockey

Under–21
In 2013, Charlet was a member of the French U–21 side at the FIH Junior World Cup, where he won a silver medal.

Senior national team
Charlet made his debut for the France senior team in 2014.

He is the current captain of the national team. In 2018, he led the team at the FIH World Cup.

References

External links
 
 

1993 births
Living people
French male field hockey players
Male field hockey defenders
2018 Men's Hockey World Cup players
Waterloo Ducks H.C. players
Men's Belgian Hockey League players
Place of birth missing (living people)
21st-century French people
2023 Men's FIH Hockey World Cup players